Littleton Football Club is a football club based in North and Middle Littleton, near Evesham, Worcestershire.

History

Littleton Football Club was formed in 1890. The joined the Midland Football Combination Division Three in 1979 but only spent three seasons in the division before leaving. Littleton rejoined in 2001–02 and won the league in their first season back, gaining promotion to Division Two. The following season they were promoted again, to Division One, after finishing runners-up. In 2011–12, Littleton finished runners-up in Division One and gained promotion to the Premier Division for 2012–13, their first season at level 10 of the English football league system.

The 2019-20 season saw Littleton moved into the West Midlands (regional) league Premier Division under the guidance of new management duo Tyrone Henderson and Oliver Hartill who saved the club from relegation in the 2018-19 season. At the end of the 2020–21 season the club were transferred to Division One of the Hellenic League.

Ground
Littleton play at Five Acres in North and Middle Littleton.

Honours
Midland Football Combination Division Three
Champions: 2001–02
Midland Football Combination Division One
Runners-up: 2011–12
Midland Football Combination Division Two
Runners-up: 2002–03

Records
FA Vase
Second Qualifying Round 2015–16

References

External links

Football clubs in Worcestershire
Midland Football Combination
Association football clubs established in 1890
1890 establishments in England
Midland Football League
Football clubs in England
Hellenic Football League